"U-Haul" is a song by American recording artist Angie Stone. It was written and produced by Missy Elliott, Nisan Stewart, Craig Brockman, and John "Jubu" Smith for Stone's third studio album Stone Love (2004). Apart from Elliott, singers Tweet and Betty Wright as well as Stone's daughter Diamond appear as backing vocalists on the song. Released as the album's second single, it reached number 19 on Billboards Adult R&B Songs. "U-Haul" was nominated for a Grammy Award for Best Female R&B Vocal Performance at the 47th Grammy Awards.

Track listings

Personnel

 Marcella Araica – recording assistance
 Carlos Bedoya – recording
 Craig Brockman – co-production, writing
 Tim Donovan – recording
 Missy Elliott – banking vocals, production, writing
 Paul Falcone – mixing

 John "Jubu" Smith – co-production, writing
 Nisan Stewart – co-production, writing
 Angie Stone – vocals, backing vocals
 Diamond Stone – backing vocals
 Tweet – backing vocals
 Betty Wright – backing vocals

Charts

References

External links
 

2004 songs
2004 singles
Songs written by Missy Elliott
J Records singles
Angie Stone songs
Songs written by Nisan Stewart
Songs written by Craig Brockman